Duke Island is an island in the Gravina Islands of the Alexander Archipelago in the southeastern part of the U.S. state of Alaska. The island is just north of the Canada–United States border. It hosts an Alaskan-type ultramafic complex which is currently being explored for magmatic sulfide Cu-Ni-PGE deposits.

The original name for the island in the Tlingit language is: Yeixhi (building), referring to it looking like something under construction when viewed from the waters around it.

The island was named by William Healey Dall in 1879. He probably took the name from the island's southern cape, which George Vancouver had named in 1793 after the Duke of Northumberland.

References

Islands of the Alexander Archipelago
Islands of Ketchikan Gateway Borough, Alaska
Islands of Alaska